Wholesale Souls Inc. is an independent film written and directed by Andrew Gingerich. The film is the first work of Gingerich and was filmed, cast, and funded primarily through his friends and family. All the scenes were filmed on location in Fort Collins, Colorado. The script had been a long running project for Gingerich and was used for his Capstone Experience, a school-based program that sponsors personal projects and gives recognition of such projects for use on resumes and applications.

Gingerich began the script after an alumnus at his high school committed suicide. This brought the proposed idea of life shattering events are not even noticed by the rest of the world. While such events may change the lives of a few, the world keeps turning.

Shooting of the film took nearly a year, also mixed with varying lengths of editing. The script was subject to many changes before the movies completion. Such changes involved adding additional focus to characters such as Elephant A. Antibody, and the necessary shifting of several characters depending on their availability. It was first publicly shown at Poudre High School on May 31, 2006. This was an incomplete version, lacking several minor shots such as computer screens and documents. A completed and cleaned version was shown at a cast party, during which the commentary track was recorded. The release of the DVD was greatly delayed due to Gingerich's (along with much of the crew's) work on the short (20+ minutes) Terminal Philosophy.

Plot 
A company known as Wholesale Souls Inc. is buying and selling human souls. A group of teens find out about this company and a boy by the name of James Young decides to sell his soul on the internet. The soul is shortly thereafter purchased by Stan L. McReynolds, the CEO of Wholesale Souls Inc.

Before long, James descends in to paranoia. James goes to Wholesale Souls with the hope of buying back his soul. Stan refuses and explains that souls do not exist in the eyes of the law, so there is nothing James can demand the return of. He begins to lose control of his life after his close friend Warren dies in a car accident. James feels that he is responsible for the death of Warren and the guilt destroys him. In the end, James kills himself.

Cast 
 Gregory Ley as James Young
 Stan McReynolds as Stan McReynolds
 Evan Riffe as Warren Brown
 Arin Baun as Alex Baun
 Erin Ray as Erin Ray
 Micah Buchele-Collins as Micah Collins
 Parker Cagle-Smith as Samuel the Hacker
 Mikhail Twarogowski as First Clown
 Eric Kurzmack as Second Clown
 Paul Binkley as Hades
 Darren Marshall as Man on TV
 Laura Parker as Operator
 Vynni Gagnepain as Elephant A. Antibody
 Isabel Thacker as Counselor
 Norma Gingerich as Judy
 Jonathan Gingerich as Interviewer
 Ethan Holbrook as Blind Pickpocket
 David Gingerich as Mail Carrier
 Sam Beres as Student Bystander

Crew 
 Additional writing: Evan Riffe, Gregory Ley, Parker Cagle-Smith
 Script consultants: Jared Ross, Sam Beres, Alex Beres
 Assistant director: Evan Riffe
 Cinematographer: Andrew Gingerich
 Sound recordist: Parker Cagle-Smith
 Gaffer: Gregory Ley
 Illustrator: Mecha Ostorga
 Boom operators: Parker Cagle-Smith, Evan Riffe, Gregory Ley, David  Gingerich, Arin Baun
 Grips: David Gingerich, Parker Cagle-Smith, Gregory Ley, Micah  Buchele-Collins
 Set carpenter: David Gingerich
 Set consultants: Gladys Nelson, Parker Cagle-Smith
 Medical consultant: Gladys Nelson
 Greens master: Micah Buchele-Collins
 Editors: Andrew Gingerich, Parker Cagle-Smith
 Assistant editor: Parker Cagle-Smith
 Editing consultants: Gregory Ley, Evan Riffe, Arin Baun
 Sound consultant: Andrew Berg
 Musical score: Kabir Vermouth, Parker Cagle-Smith
 Additional music: Parker Cagle-Smith, Gregory Ley

Additional studio space, equipment and encouragement provided by PSD Channel 10.

DVD
The DVD was released on March 8, 2007. It is a two disc set which includes multiple commentary tracks, three documentaries regarding the films production, and other extras.

External links 
Wholesale Souls Inc. Homepage
Exploding Goldfish Films and Blog
 

Wholesale Souls Inc. Trailer
Wholesale Souls Inc. Teaser

2000s English-language films